The sarcotesta is a fleshy seedcoat, a type of testa. Examples of seeds with a sarcotesta are pomegranate and some cycad seeds. The sarcotesta of pomegranate seeds consists of epidermal cells derived from the integument, and there are no arils on these seeds.

References

External links
 

Fruit morphology
Plant anatomy